Is Your Dog A Genius is a three-part American interactive documentary television series airing on Nat Geo Wild. The series, hosted by Dr. Brian Hare, uses a series of tests known as 'The Dognition Assessment' to determine what skills a dog possesses to determine how intelligent your dogs are. The series is produced by Authentic Entertainment.

Broadcast
The series premiered in the U.S. on Nat Geo Wild across three nights from May 15 to May 17, 2015. The three part series aired as part of the channel's special 'BarkFest' block of dog-themed programming.

Internationally, the series premiered in Australia on August 5, 2015, on the local version of Nat Geo People.

Episodes

References

External links

2010s American documentary television series
2015 American television series debuts
English-language television shows
Television series by Authentic Entertainment